The castra of Basarabi was a defensive fort in the Roman province of Moesia. Neither the date of its erection or its abandonment have been determined. Its ruins are located in Murfatlar (Romania).

See also
List of castra

Notes

External links
Roman castra from Romania - Google Maps / Earth

Roman legionary fortresses in Romania
History of Dobruja
Historic monuments in Constanța County